ZincFive, Inc. develops proprietary nickel-zinc battery storage technology to provide electricity for data centers and other applications.  The company is based near Portland, Oregon, and sells its products globally.

History
PowerGenix was formed near San Diego, CA in 2000. PowerGenix raised over $47 million from a number of venture capital firms, including Granite Ventures, Advent International, Braemar Energy Ventures, Bessemer Venture Partners, and OnPoint Technologies.

Joining with EnSite Power and Combined Operations
EnSite Power was formed near Portland, OR in 2015. PowerGenix merged with EnSite Power in 2016, creating ZincFive. ZincFive has raised over $78M from a number of venture capital firms, including 40 North Ventures, DBL Partners, and OGCI Climate Investments.

Since 2016 ZincFive has developed products based upon its nickel-zinc battery technology for data centers, transportation control, and industrial engine starting. Products traditionally developed for these markets are based on lead-acid or lithium ion technology; batteries based upon nickel-zinc technology potentially have improved performance with a lower environmental impact.

References

Battery manufacturers
Renewable energy
Nickel